Naysán Sahba is the Manager of Global Engagement and Partnerships at the World Bank. Prior to this, Sahba was Director of the United Nations Environment Programme’s Division of Communications and Public Information at the organization’s headquarters in Nairobi, Kenya.

Career
Sahba joined the United Nations Environment Programme in 2014. He drives communication, digital and brand strategy for the organization. He oversees teams delivering major UN initiatives, including World Environment Day, Champions of the Earth, and the Wild for Life Campaign, which combats illegal trade in wildlife and forest products. His Division also oversees communication partnerships, like the Big Picture campaign with IMAX and UNEP’s Goodwill Ambassadors program.

Sahba started his career in communication for development working with indigenous community radio stations in Latin America and producing multimedia content about sustainable approaches to development.

Sahba began working with the United Nations in 2003, working with the World Health Organization and then UNICEF on the front-lines of the Global Polio Eradication Initiative. He led campaign communications for polio eradication and immunization interventions in the state of Uttar Pradesh, India’s most populous state and a holdout for the polio virus until its successful eradication in 2011. In 2005, he transferred to the Programme Communication section of UNICEF’s India headquarters in New Delhi, where he led the organization’s entertainment-education initiatives. Sahba is credited as Creator and Executive Producer of Kyunki Jeena Issi Ka Naam Hai, a top-five prime time TV drama serial that ran for over 500 episodes and was watched by over 145 million viewers. He has co-authored research articles on the program exploring the impact of entertainment-education on social norms.

In 2009, he transferred to UNICEF Mozambique, as head of the Communication, Advocacy, Partnerships and Participation (CAPP) Section, where he was responsible for public and media relations, children and youth participation and communication for development activities.

In January 2014, Sahba transferred to Nairobi, Kenya, for his current role with UNEP.

Personal life and education 

Sahba, a Canadian national, was born in Iran and is the son of architect Fariborz Sahba. His early life was spent in Iran, England, India, Canada, and Israel. He is brother to OfficeSpace Software CEO Shamim Sahba and painter Shirin Sahba. and is married to fashion and interior designer Jalan Sahba.

He received his bachelor's degree in English literature at the University of British Columbia and a Master of Arts in International Development and English Studies from the University of Guelph.

Sahba is a member of the Baháʼí Faith.

References 

Canadian officials of the United Nations

Year of birth missing (living people)
Living people
Iranian emigrants to Canada